"Antes de Ti" is a song by Chilean singer Mon Laferte released originally on February 2, 2018, through Universal Music Group as a non-album single. The song was written and produced by Laferte and Manuel Soto. A Japanese version of "Antes de Ti" was released on May 4, 2018 and both versions were released in vinyl format on May 23, 2018. It received a Latin Grammy nomination for Song of the Year.

Background

The song was written and produced by Mon Laferte and Manú Jalil. The song was born during the Amárrame Tour in Chile, during 2017, as a product of an improvisation between the two authors. Laferte took as inspiration for the song the 1973 Japanese film Lady Snowblood. The film tells the story of a hero who seeks her destiny. Laferte explains: "Suddenly a melody like a soundtrack, very cinematic, with violins came to my mind... And the song has a lot of that, of movie music. I visualized it like this".  "Antes de Ti" was also inspired by Juan Gabriel, Cecilia and Raphael; Laferte said: "If you ask me personally, I think it is a rather personal search to need someone by your side to be happy, and it's something that I understood many years ago, but I still like this romantic idea of saying 'I was sad until I met you'. Juan Gabriel said it the other way around in his song ‘I was happy until I met you’, I love that emotional blackmail which is beautiful, which is an exaggeration to”.

The song was presented live in the concerts at the Teatro Caupolicán, of the aforementioned Amárrame Tour on June 20 and July 21, 2017, along with another unpublished song "Cuenda Era Flor", the latter being included in the deluxe version of the album La Trenza.

Although «Antes de Ti» was not included in the album La Trenza, only being released as a non-album single, the artist considered its release as the last track of this album.

In May 2018, she published a Japanese version of the song, which comes with a video with the letters in Japanese alphabet and hepburn, fulfilling one of her dreams of singing in that language.

Music video 

The music video for "Antes de Ti" was published on February 1, 2019, it was directed by Laferte and has Catina Alfredo Altamirano as director of photography. The clip features Japanese aesthetics. As January 2020, the music video has over 100 million views on YouTube.

Track listing

Personnel 
Credits adapted from "Antes de Ti" liner notes.

Vocals

 Mon Laferte – lead vocals

Musicians

 Manuel Soto – glockenspiel, xylophone
Santiago Lara – guitar
Angel Víquez – trumpet
Néstor Varela – trombone
José Huerta – saxophone
Fermín Fortiz – bass
Vinicio Toledo – drums

Production

Mon Laferte – production
Manuel Soto – production, recording arrangements
Eduardo del Águila – mixing, recording
Alan Ortiz – recording

Charts

Weekly charts

Year-end charts

Release history

References

2018 songs
2018 singles
Mon Laferte songs
Songs written by Mon Laferte